Rachel Lowe (born 1968) is a British artist and filmmaker.

Early life and education
Lowe was born in Newcastle upon Tyne. She studied at the  Camberwell College of Arts from 1987 to 1990 and at the Chelsea School of Art from 1992 to 1993.

Career
Her work is included in the collections of the Tate Museum, London and the British Council.

References

1968 births
Living people
20th-century English women artists
21st-century English women artists
Alumni of Camberwell College of Arts
Alumni of Chelsea College of Arts
Artists from Newcastle upon Tyne